The FIL European Luge Championships 1953 took place in Cortina d'Ampezzo, Italy under the auspices of the Fédération Internationale de Bobsleigh et de Tobogganing (FIBT - International Bobsleigh and Tobogganing Federation in ) under their "Section de Luge", a trend that would continue until the International Luge Federation (FIL) was formed in 1957. The Austrians repeated their feat at the 1951 European championships by sweeping all of the medals in all three events.

Men's singles

Women's singles

Men's doubles

Medal table

References
Men's doubles European champions
Men's singles European champions
Women's singles European champions

FIL European Luge Championships
1953 in luge
Luge in Italy
1953 in Italian sport